Sandeep Saurav is a member of Bihar Legislative Assembly, representing Paliganj Vidhan Sabha from Communist Party of India (Marxist–Leninist) (Liberation). He is also the National General Secretary of All India Students Association, one of the major left wing students organisations. He is the leader of CPIML Liberation and represents Paliganj in Bihar State Legislative Assembly.

Political life 
Bihar State Legislative Assembly Election 2020

References 

Bihari politicians
Bihar MLAs 2020–2025
Communist Party of India (Marxist–Leninist) Liberation politicians
Living people
People from Patna
People from Patna district
1987 births